Caleb Jewell (born 21 April 1997) is an Australian cricketer. He made his first-class debut for Tasmania on 15 March 2016 in the 2015–16 Sheffield Shield. In September 2018, he was named in the Hobart Hurricanes' squad for the 2018 Abu Dhabi T20 Trophy. He made his Twenty20 debut for the Hobart Hurricanes in the 2018 Abu Dhabi T20 Trophy on 5 October 2018. In February 2021, during the 2020–21 Sheffield Shield season, Jewell scored his maiden first-class century.

References

External links
 

1997 births
Living people
Australian cricketers
Hobart Hurricanes cricketers
Tasmania cricketers
Cricketers from Hobart